"Brown Shoes Don't Make It" is a song by The Mothers of Invention, written by band leader Frank Zappa. It is the 14th and penultimate song on their second album Absolutely Free. The song is one of his most widely renowned works, declared by the AllMusic as "Zappa's first real masterpiece".

History
The title was inspired by an event covered by Time magazine reporter Hugh Sidey in 1966. The reporter correctly guessed that something was amiss when the fastidiously dressed President Lyndon B. Johnson made the sartorial faux pas of wearing  brown shoes with a gray suit. Johnson flew to Vietnam for a surprise public relations visit later that day.

Live versions of this song are featured on the albums Tinsel Town Rebellion and Road Tapes, Venue 2.

Music and lyrics
The song was written in April 1966 during a trip to Honolulu where The Mothers played for a week at a club called "Da Swamp". The lyrics are derived from Zappa's belief that people who make laws are sexually maladjusted. It starts as a general attack on suburban American society: TV, greed and conformity are all mocked openly. The story then moves to a city hall official fantasizing about having sex with a thirteen-year-old girl.

The music makes several stylistic shifts, covering hard rock, classical, psychedelic rock, vaudeville and jazz. It is cited by AllMusic as being a "condensed two-hour musical". The song lasts 7:30 and is the twelfth track (fourteenth on CD reissues) on Absolutely Free. According to Zappa, the beginning background music was inspired by Lightnin' Slim's "Have Your Way".

Reception
The song has received widespread acclaim from critics, and is considered by many as "Zappa's first masterpiece". In a positive review of the album, Dominique Chevalier said "there are snatches of dodecaphonic scales, ballads, rock, R&B, Beach Boys, soap opera and more ... and ensures that this is no piece of easy listening". As well as giving its parent album 4.5 stars, AllMusic gave a very positive review of the song. It is also included in The Rock and Roll Hall of Fame's 500 Songs that Shaped Rock and Roll.

Personnel
Frank Zappa – guitar, vocals
Jimmy Carl Black – drums, vocals
Ray Collins – vocals, tambourine
Roy Estrada – bass, vocals
Bunk Gardner – woodwinds
Billy Mundi – drums, percussion
Don Preston – keyboards
Jim Fielder – guitar, piano

with:
Suzy Creamcheese (Lisa Cohen) – vocals
Jim Getzoff – violin
Marshall Sosson – violin
Alvin Dinkin – viola
Armand Kaproff – cello
Don Ellis – trumpet
John Rotella – contrabass clarinet

References

External links 
Lyrics 

1967 songs
Experimental rock songs
Frank Zappa songs
Satirical songs
Political songs
Protest songs
Songs about school
Songs about labor
Songs written by Frank Zappa
Song recordings produced by Frank Zappa
Song recordings produced by Tom Wilson (record producer)